Endless Days is an album by German double bassist and composer Eberhard Weber recorded in Norway in 2000 and released on the ECM label.

Reception
The Allmusic review by David R. Adler awarded the album 2½ stars, stating, "Weber's new compositions involve little improvisation and a steadfast avoidance of typical jazz vocabulary. Evocative and thoroughly composed, these tracks have something of a European classical, chamber jazz feel... Well done and moving at times, but a bit mild and innocuous overall". All About Jazz noted "Endless Days occupies a distinct niche in the accumulating body of ECM records with sparse, reverberant sound and stark, often melancholy themes. The "composed" aspect of the record offers a degree of formalism that sets it apart from some of the more improvised music on the label".

Track listing
All compositions by Eberhard Weber
 "Concerto for Bass" - 6:09  
 "French Diary" - 6:46  
 "Solo for Bass" - 3:39  
 "Nuit Blanche" - 4:45  
 "A Walk in the Garrigue" - 3:28  
 "Concerto for Piano" - 4:46  
 "Endless Days" - 8:35  
 "The Last Stage of a Long Journey" - 9:20

Personnel
Eberhard Weber - bass
Paul McCandless - oboe, English horn, bass clarinet, soprano saxophone
Rainer Brüninghaus - piano, keyboards
Michael Di Pasqua - drums, percussion

References

ECM Records albums
Eberhard Weber albums
2001 albums
Albums produced by Manfred Eicher